Wangaratta and Rutherglen was an electoral district of the Legislative Assembly in the Australian state of Victoria from 1889 to 1904. It was located around the towns of Wangaratta and Rutherglen. When it was abolished in 1904, the new Electoral district of Wangaratta was created; John Bowser was the last member for Wangaratta and Rutherglen and the first for Wangaratta.

Members

References

Former electoral districts of Victoria (Australia)
1889 establishments in Australia
1904 disestablishments in Australia